Rascal Does Not Dream of a Sister Venturing Out is an upcoming 2023 Japanese animated supernatural romantic drama film based on the eighth and ninth volumes of the light novel series Rascal Does Not Dream of Bunny Girl Senpai written by Hajime Kamoshida and illustrated by Keeji Mizoguchi. The film is produced by CloverWorks and serves as a sequel to the 2019 anime film Rascal Does Not Dream of a Dreaming Girl. It will be released in Japan in Q3 2023.

Voice cast

Production
The project was initially announced during the Aniplex Online Fest event in September 2022. It was confirmed to be released as a theatrical flim in December 2022, featuring a returning staff, including director Sōichi Masui, scriptwriter Masahiro Yokotani and character designer Satomi Tamura. The film is a sequel to Rascal Does Not Dream of a Dreaming Girl and adapted from the eighth and ninth volumes of the light novel series Rascal Does Not Dream of Bunny Girl Senpai written by Hajime Kamoshida and illustrated by Keeji Mizoguchi.

Release
Rascal Does Not Dream of a Sister Venturing Out is set to premiere theatrically in Japan in Q3 2023.

Notes

References

External links

 

2020s supernatural films
2023 anime films
2023 films
Animated films about time travel
Anime films based on light novels
Aniplex
CloverWorks
Japanese animated films
Supernatural romantic films
Upcoming sequel films